Shha with hook (Һ̡, һ̡) is a letter of the Cyrillic script formerly used in some alphabets in Kabardian and an alphabet for Chechen.

Use 

Computing codes 
This letter has not yet been added to Unicode.

See also 
 Ꜧ ꜧ - Heng
 Һ һ - Shha 
 Ԧ ԧ - Shha with descender
 Kabardian language
 Cyrillic script

Sources

References

Cyrillic letters
Letters with hook
Unencoded Cyrillic letters